Charles Bradford Smith (May 7, 1916May 27, 2004) was a United States Army officer who served in World War II and the Korean War. He received the Silver Star medal and the Distinguished Service Cross for his actions in South Korea.

Biography
Born in Lambertville, New Jersey, Smith attended the United States Military Academy, graduating in 1939. He married Bettie Evans in October 1941.

Captain Smith was at Schofield Barracks, Oahu during the Pearl Harbor attack. When the Korean War began in 1950 the Lieutenant Colonel commanded the 1st Battalion of the 21st Infantry Regiment, part of the 24th Infantry Division. He led Task Force Smith at the Battle of Osan, for which he received the Distinguished Service Cross.

He reached the rank of brigadier general and eventually retired in 1965.

In his later life, Smith lived in Scottsdale, Arizona.

References 

1916 births
2004 deaths
United States Army personnel of World War II
United States Army personnel of the Korean War
People from Lambertville, New Jersey
Recipients of the Silver Star
United States Army generals
Recipients of the Distinguished Service Cross (United States)
Military personnel from New Jersey